Cobscook Bay State Park is a public recreation area occupying  on the western shore of Cobscook Bay in Washington County, Maine. The name Cobscook is a Maliseet-Passamaquoddy word for boiling tides. It is managed by the Maine Department of Agriculture, Conservation and Forestry.

History
The park was created in 1964 when the Federal government offered to lease to the state of Maine lands that remain part of Moosehorn National Wildlife Refuge. The long-term agreement was arranged at no cost to the state.

Activities and amenities 
The park offers hiking trails, picnicking, camping, boat launch, and bird watching. Over 200 species of birds have been noted, including the American bald eagle.

References

External links
Cobscook Bay State Park Department of Agriculture, Conservation and Forestry
Cobscook Bay State Park Guide & Map Department of Agriculture, Conservation and Forestry

State parks of Maine
Protected areas of Washington County, Maine
Protected areas established in 1964
Campgrounds in Maine
1964 establishments in Maine